Robert Elliott,  D.D. (1658-1735) was an Irish Anglican priest.

Cox was born in Kilkenny and educated at Trinity College, Dublin. He was appointed a Prebendary of Leighlin Cathedral in 1710, Treasurer of Ferns from 1714 to 1717 and then Archdeacon of Ferns, then holding both positions, dean and prebend, until his death in 1735.

Notes

Alumni of Trinity College Dublin
Irish Anglicans
People from Kilkenny (city)
Archdeacons of Ferns
1735 deaths
1658 births